Mustafa Can (born October 15, 1969 in Turkey) is a Kurdish-Swedish author and journalist. His first novel Tätt intill dagarna was published in 2006.

References 

1969 births
Living people
Swedish journalists
Turkish emigrants to Sweden
Swedish people of Kurdish descent